The IBM DS8000 series (early IBM System Storage DS8000 series) is an IBM storage media platform with hybrid flash and hard disk storage for IBM mainframes and other enterprise grade computing environments.

Description
This series was formerly designed as a line of cabinet-size solutions, prior to the more compact and affordable rack-mount DS6000 series.  In 2015 the DS6000 line were discontinued, and the all-flash entry-level DS8882F model was released as a rack-mount successor of DS6000 line.

All IBM DS storage lines are based on an IBM Power CPU and use IBM Power Systems servers as controllers.

Models

 TotalStorage models:
 DS8100 - released in 2004 
 Dual 2-core POWER5+-based controllers
 Can contain up to 384 drives (Fibre Channel or SATA)
 DS8300 - released in 2004 
 Dual 4-core POWER5+-based controllers (based on p570 servers)
 Can contain up to 1024 drives (Fibre Channel or SATA)
 System Storage models:
DS8100 Turbo - released in 2006
DS8300 Turbo - released in 2006
DS8700 - released in 2009 
 Dual 2- or 4-core POWER6-based controllers
 Can contain up to 1024 drives (3.5” 15K RPM Fibre Channel HDD or enterprise flash drives)
 DS8800 - released in 2010 
 Dual 2- or 4-core POWER6+-based controllers
 Can contain up to 1536 drives (2.5": 10K or 15K RPM HDD or SSD enterprise flash SAS-2 drives, or 3.5": Nearline-SAS drives)
 DS8870 - released in 2012 
 Dual 2-, 4-, 8- or 16-core POWER7-based controllers (Since December 2013 based on POWER7+)
 Running SMT-4 for 64 threads
 1 TiB Cache
 Can contain up to 1536 drives (2.5": 10K or 15K RPM HDD or enterprise flash SAS-2, or 3.5": Nearline-SAS drives) + 120 1.8" flash cards in the High-Performance Flash Enclosure (HPFE)
 High Performance Flash Enclosure:  integrates and optimizes flash technology in the DS8870 (High-performance flash enclosure fits into existing DS8870 bay)
 Up to 8 Flash Enclosures per System : 96 TB raw per system
 DS8880 Family - released in end of 2015; base models with mixed storage (DS8884 and DS8886) and all-flash solutions (DS888#F).
 DS8882F - all-flash version for rack-mounting (17U, 16U without KVM)
 DS8884
 Dual 6-core POWER8-based controllers
 Running SMT-4 for 24 threads
 Up to 256 GiB Cache
 Can contain up to 783 HDD or SSD drives + 120 1.8" flash cards in the High-Performance Flash Enclosure (HPFE)
 2.5" 10K or 15K RPM drives and enterprise flash SAS-2 drives
 3.5" Nearline-SAS drives
 High Performance Flash Enclosure: integrates and optimizes flash technology in the DS8884F (Flash enclosure can fits into existing DS8870 bay)
 Up to 4 Flash Enclosures per System : 48 TB raw per system
 DS8886
 Dual 8- to 24-core POWER8-based controllers
 Running SMT-4 for 96 threads
 Up to 2 TiB Cache
 Can contain up to 1536 HDD or SSD drives + 240 1.8" flash cards in the High-Performance Flash Enclosure (HPFE)
 2.5" 10K or 15K RPM drives and enterprise flash SAS-2 drives
 3.5" Nearline-SAS drives
 High Performance Flash Enclosure: integrates and optimizes flash technology in the DS8886F
 Up to 8 Flash Enclosures per System : 96 TB raw per system
 DS8888F
 Dual 48-core POWER8-based controllers
 Running SMT-4 for 192 threads
 Up to 2 TiB Cache
 High Performance Flash Enclosure: integrates and optimizes flash technology in the DS8888F
 Can contain up to 480 1.8" flash cards in the High-Performance Flash Enclosure (HPFE)
 Up to 16 Flash Enclosures per System : 192 TB raw per system
 DS89#0F - released in 2020
IBM DS8910F - Rack-mounting (20U, 19U without KVM)
based on a dual IBM Power Systems S922, S914, or S924 controllers
IBM DS8950F
42U assembled rack cabinet

See also
 IBM storage
 IBM Storwize - x86-based rackable analog, HDD-oriented (discontinued)
 IBM XIV - x86-based cabinet-size analog, HDD-oriented (discontinued)
 IBM FlashSystem - x86-based Flash analog

References

IBM storage servers